Krinitsa is a rural locality (a selo) in Radchenskoye Rural Settlement, Bogucharsky District, Voronezh Oblast, Russia. The population was 509 as of 2010. There are 9 streets.

Geography 
Krinitsa is located 37 km south of Boguchar (the district's administrative centre) by road. Varvarovka is the nearest rural locality.

References 

Rural localities in Bogucharsky District